Arthur Lee (born May 27, 1977) is an American former professional basketball player. A 6'1¼", 180 lb. point guard from Stanford University, Lee guided the Stanford Cardinal to the Final Four in 1998. He was undrafted by the NBA, and has played for various basketball clubs throughout Europe since 1999.

College career
Lee played college basketball at Stanford University with the Stanford Cardinal from 1995-99.  Arthur graduated from North Hollywood High School in 1995.  He was an All-LA City guard for the Huskies.

Professional career
In his professional career, Lee has played with: Kombassan Konya, Cibona Zagreb, Basket Rimini, Dinamo Sassari, Hapoel Nahariya, ES Chalon sur Saône, AEL Larissa, CEZ Basketball Nymburk and APOEL Nicosia.

Awards and achievements 
 An Associated Press honorable mention All-American during his senior season
 Gained numerous post-season awards during his senior season including All-Pac-10
 Also nominated for the John Wooden and Naismith Awards, and the Oscar Robertson Trophy
 The first Stanford basketball player to grace the cover of Sports Illustrated (college basketball pre-season issue)
 His career free throw percentage of .866 is #2 all-time in Stanford history, and fourth-best in Pac-10 history
 The current NCAA Tournament record holder in free throw percentage ... In 12 NCAA games, Lee made 58-of-62 free throws for .935
 Won the Pac-10 free throw title two years in a row
 Ranks in the Top 10 in seven career categories in the school record book
 Scored 13 of Stanford's final 17 points to lead the Cardinal to a 79-77 victory and a berth in the NCAA Final Four
 Won the Croatian National Championship and Cup in 2000/01 with KK Cibona Zagreb.

External links
Euroleague.net Profile
Eurobasket.com Profile

1977 births
Living people
A.E.L. 1964 B.C. players
African-American basketball players
American expatriate basketball people in Croatia
American expatriate basketball people in Cyprus
American expatriate basketball people in the Czech Republic
American expatriate basketball people in France
American expatriate basketball people in Greece
American expatriate basketball people in Israel
American expatriate basketball people in Italy
American expatriate basketball people in Lebanon
American expatriate basketball people in Poland
American expatriate basketball people in Turkey
American men's basketball players
APOEL B.C. players
Basketball players from Los Angeles
Basket Rimini Crabs players
Basketball Nymburk players
Dinamo Sassari players
Élan Chalon players
Ironi Nahariya players
KK Cibona players
Point guards
Stanford Cardinal men's basketball players
Turów Zgorzelec players
North Hollywood High School alumni
21st-century African-American sportspeople
20th-century African-American sportspeople